Philipp Haastrup (born 5 March 1982) is a German former professional footballer who played as a defender.

Career 
Born in Münster, West Germany, Haastrup played professional club football in Germany and the Netherlands for VfL Osnabrück, Rot-Weiss Essen, 1. FC Saarbrücken, MVV Maastricht, Helmond Sport and Willem II. On 14 June 2013, he announced his retirement from professional league football, returning to Germany to sign for BFC Dynamo.

In his first season with BFC the club secured promotion to Regionalliga and extended his contract throughout the 2014–15 Regionalliga season.

In the summer of 2016, he joined Tennis Borussia Berlin, but left during the winter break.

References

External links 
 

1982 births
Living people
Sportspeople from Münster
German footballers
Footballers from North Rhine-Westphalia
Association football defenders
Eredivisie players
Eerste Divisie players
2. Bundesliga players
VfL Osnabrück players
Rot-Weiss Essen players
1. FC Saarbrücken players
MVV Maastricht players
Helmond Sport players
Willem II (football club) players
Berliner FC Dynamo players
Tennis Borussia Berlin players
German expatriate footballers
German expatriate sportspeople in the Netherlands
Expatriate footballers in the Netherlands